Euploea eurianassa is a butterfly in the family Nymphalidae. It was described by William Chapman Hewitson in 1858. It is endemic to New Guinea in the Australasian realm.
  
The larva feeds on Ichnocarpus frutescens.

References

External links
Euploea at Markku Savela's Lepidoptera and Some Other Life Forms

Euploea
Butterflies described in 1858